Leptophobia nephthis is a butterfly in the  family Pieridae. It is found in Peru and Bolivia.

References

Pierini
Butterflies described in 1874
Pieridae of South America